Boss of All Bosses is a Nigerian family-friendly comedy about the rivalry between two executives; Tony and Samuel, who would stop at nothing for the title of being the top boss. Release on June 15, the movie stars Akpororo, Nedu Wazobia fm, Mama G (Patience Ozokwo), Okon Lagos (Bishop Ime), Senator (Bethel Njoku), Emeka Kachikwu, Adunni Ade, Sani Danja, Eniola Badmus and Babatunde Charles.

Release 
Boss of all Bosses was released in Nigeria on June 15, 2018.

Reception 

Tireni Adebayo, writing for Kemi Filani News, described the movie as "Profoundly irritating and annoying", and went on to say that the film could well be "the worst Nollywood movie we have ever seen in cinema" and advised viewers to "Work hard to avoid this rubbish forever; even on TV". Omidire Idowu, writing for Pulse.NG, was more praising describing the film as "among the movies that explore Nigerian problems from a fresh perspective".

See also
 List of Nigerian films of 2018

References

2018 films
Nigerian comedy films
English-language Nigerian films